The May 13, 1962 Cumberland National Championship Sports Car Races was the fourth racing event of the twelfth season of the Sports Car Club of America's 1962 Championship Racing Series.

SCCA National Cumberland [AP+BP] results

References

External links
RacingSportsCars.com
World Sports Racing Prototypes
VeloceToday.com
Dick Lang Racing History

Cumberland